Cold Spring is a village in the town of Philipstown in Putnam County, New York, United States. The population was 1,986 at the 2020 census. It borders the smaller village of Nelsonville and the hamlets of Garrison and North Highlands. The central area of the village is on the National Register of Historic Places as the Cold Spring Historic District due to its many well-preserved 19th-century buildings, constructed to accommodate workers at the nearby West Point Foundry (itself a Registered Historic Place today). The town is the birthplace of General Gouverneur K. Warren, who was an important figure in the Union Army during the Civil War. The village, located in the Hudson Highlands, sits at the deepest point of the Hudson River, directly across from West Point. Cold Spring serves as a weekend getaway for many residents of New York City.

Commuter service to New York City is available via the Cold Spring train station, served by Metro-North Railroad. The train journey is approximately one hour,  ten minutes to Grand Central Terminal.

History

Early industry
The site of present-day Cold Spring was part of the lands belonging to Merrick Williams. The first settler of Cold Spring was Merrick Williams in 1730. In 1772, a highway master was chosen for the road from Cold Spring to the Post Road from New York to Albany. A small trading hamlet grew alongside the river by the early 1800s. A couple of sloops made regular weekly trips from Cold Spring to New York, carrying wood and some country produce, which came over this model road from the east. Those trips by sloop usually took a week.

In 1818, Gouverneur Kemble established the West Point Foundry opposite West Point to produce artillery pieces for the United States Government. The nearby mountains contained veins of ore, and were covered with timber for fuel. A brook provided hydropower, and the Hudson a ready shipping outlet. In 1843, the Foundry built the USS Spencer, the first iron ship built in the U.S. With the influx of workers at the Foundry, local housing, businesses and churches increased, and Cold Spring was incorporated as a village in 1846. The first President of the Village was Joshua Haight. The Foundry became famous for its production of Parrott rifles and other munitions during the Civil War, when the foundry grew to a sprawling 100-acre complex employing 1,400. It also manufactured cast iron steam engines for locomotives, gears, and produced much of the pipework for New York's water system. The rise of steel making and the declining demand for cast iron after the Civil War caused the Foundry to cease operations in 1911.

Many artifacts from the Foundry's history can be viewed at the Putnam History Museum on Chestnut Street. Built in 1830, the building was originally a one-room schoolhouse for the Foundry's teenage apprentices and the children of employees.

On January 22, 1896, local businessmen of Cold Spring formed a fire brigade known as the Cold Spring Hose Company, No.1. A horse-drawn hook and ladder was donated in 1899. The Municipal Building, designed by Louis Mekeel, was constructed in 1926 to house the company's first firetruck, an American LaFrance. The company, renamed Cold Spring Fire Company No.1 in 1900, serves the Villages of Cold Spring, Nelsonville and a district in the Town of Philipstown.

Mr. Willis Buckner, a former slave from the South, was a driver and groom for Susan and Anna Bartlett Warner at their farm on Constitution Island. Mr. Buckner taught Sunday School at the Methodist Church. In the early decades of the 20th century, blacks who stayed in this part of New York state migrated away from rural towns to nearby cities with waterfront manufacturing such as Peekskill, Beacon, Newburgh and Ossining. During the 1920s, the Ku Klux Klan had a presence in Cold Spring as well as Fishkill and Nelsonville.

Pete Seeger formed the Clearwater organization, an environmental group dedicated to advances in sewer treatment, industrial waste disposal, and addressing the discharge of major pollutants into the Hudson.
In 1970, the sloop Clearwater docked for a songfest at Cold Spring. As Seeger appeared on stage to thank the audience for coming, fifteen drunks stood up waving little American flags, yelling “Throw the Commies out.” That night someone cut the sloop's moorings and there were threats to torch the boat. All of this created tension within the Clearwater organization.

Country estates
Towards the latter part of the nineteenth century artists, writers and prominent families were drawn to Cold Spring by the beauty of the Hudson Highlands. Mansions were built along Morris Avenue, including "Undercliff", the home of publisher George Pope Morris, and "Craigside", the home of Julia and General Daniel Butterfield.

Attractions

Cold Spring’s main street attracts tourists in all seasons. Retail, restaurants, and nearby walks and hikes draw visitors from the region with ferry service providing transportation for tourists in autumn. The Foundry Preserve Trail is an easy in-town walk, while the trailheads to the north offer more rigorous options including Breakneck Ridge.

The Julia L. Butterfield Memorial Library was established in 1913, through the Will of Mrs. Julia L. Butterfield.  The Library building was built on the foundation of the Dutch Reformed Church in 1922. The Library opened in May 1925.

In 2017, art collectors Nancy Olnick and Giorgio Spanu opened Magazzino Italian Art, a 20,000 sq. ft museum focusing on Postwar and Contemporary Italian Art. Admission to the museum is free to the public.

Six miles east of the village is Clarence Fahnestock State Park and the Appalachian Trail. The park offers camp sites, hikes, picnic grounds, and lakes. Within Fahnestock is Stonecrop Gardens, a traditional Alpine garden open to the public since 1992. Stonecrop was created by Garden Conservancy founder Frank Cabot and his wife, Anne, in 1958. Adjacent to Stonecrop is Glynwood Center for Regional Food and Farming.

Geography

The village is bordered by the Hudson River to the west, and is bound by the Hudson Highlands State Park to the north, where Mount Taurus and Breakneck Ridge rise steeply and dramatically out of the banks of the Hudson and form two basically parallel ridges that track each other inland. The valley between them has an abandoned dairy farm, two lakes, and a camp. The view from the river bank is the Constitution Marsh and the US Military Academy (West Point) slightly to the south, and Crow's Nest and Storm King Mountain to the west and northwest. All of this considered, the village is nestled in the most prominent vertical terrain on the Hudson River north of New York City prior to the Shawangunk and Catskill ranges. Being bound by these formidable terrain features has kept the size of the village small, and prevented the suburban sprawl that has come about in the less-constrained regions to the north and south and in the New York Metropolitan area generally. This unique sense of place, and the village's historic housing stock, have made it a very popular weekend destination for tourists from New York City. Its oldest current home is located on 191 Main Street and was built in 1814. Some say Abraham Lincoln visited that house when he visited Cold Spring.

Demographics

As of the census of 2020, there were 1,986 people, 834 households, and 834 families residing in the village. The population density was 3,300 people per square mile (1,300/km2). The racial makeup of the village was 94% White, 0.49% African American, 0.44% Native American, 3.05% Asian, 2.12% from other races, and 0.08% from two or more races. Hispanic or Latino of any race were 0.07% of the population.

Out of the 834 households, 25.1% had children under the age of 18 living with them, 41.9% were married couples living together. The average household size was 2.13 and the average family size was 3.0.

The median income for a household in the village was $98,056 (an increase of 83.7% from 2010), and the median income for a family was $135,500 (an increase of 78.2% from 2010). About 8.4% of the population were below the poverty line, including 13.8% of those under age 18 and 4.4% of those age 65 or over.

Churches
Under the auspices of Superintendent William Young, a Presbyterian from the north of Ireland, arrangements were to conduct religious services in the pattern shop. The premises was shared by Episcopalians, Presbyterians, and Baptists. The Methodists used a private home. Once every three weeks Rev. Owens from Patterson came to minister to the Presbyterians. Elder Warren from Kent cared for the religious needs of the Baptists. In the absence of an ordained minister, services were occasionally conducted by Foundry President Gouverneur Kemble. 1826 the Union Church was built. The celebrated preacher Thomas De Witt Talmage from Brooklyn is reported to have sometimes officiated there. The sacramental vessels were of pewter. By mutual agreement the Presbyterians used the building in the morning and the other religious groups in the afternoon. In 1830 the Baptists constructed a church on land donated by Samuel L. Gouverneur.

The first Methodist church was built in 1833 on the corner of Main and Church Streets. The building was sold in 1870. A new brick Italianate structure, designed by William Humphreys Jr., was built in 1868 on the north side of Main Street.

The Dutch Reformed Church was built around 1855 in Neoclassical style. The building was later replaced by the Julia L. Butterfield Library.

Our Lady of Loretto

Many of the workers at the Foundry were Irish immigrants. As early as 1830, Rev. Fr Philip O'Reilly O.P., from County Cavan, Ireland visited Cold Spring to minister to Catholics. At that time, O'Reilly was also attending to congregations in Newburgh and High Falls. O'Reilly raised money to build a church, and Foundry owner Gouverneur Kemble, an Episcopalian, donated the land and funds. Kemble was denounced in the local newspaper for "abetting the idolatry of the mass". The building was designed in the Greek Revival style by Thomas Kelah Wharton. It was constructed in 1833 of locally made red brick covered with stucco. The church stood twenty-five feet above the river and fifteen feet from the edge of promontory on which it was set. The church was consecrated on Sunday, September 21, 1834 by Bishop John DuBois. In 1837 Rev. Patrick Duffy became pastor, with mission outposts in Newburgh, Poughkeepsie, and Saugerties.

Workers tested cannons by firing at Storm King Mountain. Test firing from the Foundry damaged the chapel walls, and Captain Robert P. Parrott, the then Foundry superintendent paid for repairs. Victorian additions altered the building's integrity, and the coming of the railroad cut it off from the rest of the village. The church was abandoned in 1906 and fell into disrepair. A fire caused further damage in 1927. In 1971, a group of interested persons, including actress Helen Hayes, purchased it from the Archdiocese of New York and undertook restoration. The work was overseen by architect Walter Knight Sturges, and the chapel was re-dedicated as an ecumenical site in 1977.

In the 1900s Our Lady of Loretto had mission stations in Garrison and Manitou. The cornerstone of the present church was laid in 1906. The organ incorporates portions of five post-Civil War ranks of pipes believed to have been built by Levi Stuart. The Grove, also known as Loretto Rest, is a historic house located on Grove Court in Cold Spring. It was built as the estate of Frederick Lente, surgeon at the nearby  Foundry and later a founder of the American Academy of Medicine in the mid-19th century. The Italian-villa design, popular at the time, was by the prominent architect Richard Upjohn. After death of Mrs. Lente in 1901, it was inherited by Patrick Connick, pastor of Our Lady of Loretto, and became a convalescent home for priests run by the Sisters of Charity. It was later converted into a convent for Franciscan nuns who taught at the parish school, which operated from 1913 to 1977. In 2008 the building was listed on the National Register of Historic Places.

Saint Mary's in the Highlands
The early Episcopal congregation was served by clergy from St. Philips in Garrison. In 1835 the Rev. Charles Lucke conducted services in Cold Spring. He was followed by Rev. Henry L. Storrs and then Rev. Edward C. Bull. In 1839 a number of English immigrants arrived to work at the Foundry. As members of the Church of England, the need for a formal Episcopal parish became apparent. Messrs Kemble and Parrott were chosen church wardens. Rev. Ebenezer Williams was the first pastor.

The parish was incorporated on June 19, 1840. It is generally believed that the name of the parish was suggested by Parrott's wife Mary, who provided the funds to build the church. On June 30, Bishop Benjamin T. Onderdonk of the Episcopal Diocese of New York laid the cornerstone. That same year Rev. Williams recorded twenty-five burials, noting the prevalence of sickness in the area. The Gothic brick church, with a tower whose bell weighed 910 pounds, was completed in 1841 and consecrated in November. Besides Bishop Onderdonk, also in attendance were: Rev. John Brown of St. George's Newburgh, Rev. Moses Marcey of St. Peter's Peekskill, and Rev. Freeman Clarkson of St. Anna's of Fishkill Landing.

A second larger church was built in 1867. Designed in the Victorian Gothic style by architect and vestry member George Edward Harney, and built under the direction of Sylvanus Ferris on land donated by Robert Parrott, it was completed the following year. It was constructed of gray granite donated by the estate of F.P. James. Situated at Main and Chestnut Streets, the church has a commanding view overlooking the village and river. The consecration of the church took place in a ceremony led by Bishop Horatio Potter on July 23, 1869. On that day the great bell in the tower, weighing 1,100 pounds, rang for the first time.

Initially Sunday school classes were conducted in the basement of the church which proved too dark, damp and cold for the children. Harney and Ferris completed St. Mary's Parish Hall in 1874. The hall was the gift of Frederick and Julia James to honor the memory of their sons Frederick and Julian, who both served in the Union army during the Civil War.

A fire broke out in the north transept in July 1961 causing significant damage to the church's roof and interior. The chancel roof was completely destroyed and the transept roofs were badly burned. The original organ and most of the stained glass were lost while the furniture fortunately survived with little damage. The church was restored within a year and rededicated in 1962 by Bishop Horace W. B. Donegan. Walter Jago of Sleepy Hollow Restoration, the restoration architect, donated the "Christ Window" above the Floyd-Jones altar in the south transept.

Rectors

Media
Cold Spring has two weekly newspapers: The Highlands Current, founded in 2010, published on Friday and the Putnam County News & Recorder, founded in 1868, published on Wednesday.

Schools
Cold Spring is home to the Haldane Central School District. The school is located at 11 Craigside Drive and teaches students grades K-12. The school received a blue ribbon award in 2017 from the U.S. Department of Education.

Summer camps
Surprise Lake Camp is located just outside Cold Spring when it was the last stop on the Hudson River Line in 1902. The camp is a Jewish Summer Camp funded by the UJA Federation of New York. Some famous campers were Eddie Cantor, Larry King, Neil Diamond, Jerry Stiller, Neil Simon, and many more.

Notable people
Gail Brown, actress
Bob Duffy, college and pro basketball player, born in Cold Spring
Scotti Hill, rock musician 
Albert L. Ireland, United States Marine
Sean Patrick Maloney - Congressman from New York's 18th Congressional District 
Jean Marzollo, writer, creator of the I Spy book series
Sarah P. Monks, California naturalist, born in Cold Spring
Charlie Plummer, American actor, grew up in Cold Spring
 Emily Warren Roebling, first female field engineer of the Brooklyn Bridge
Gouverneur K. Warren, American military commander during the Civil War and hero of the Battle of Gettysburg

See also
 Cold Spring Historic District

References

External links

 Village of Cold Spring official website
 Julia L. Butterfield Library
 offMetro Guide to Cold Spring
 Livingston-Svirsky Archive (LiSA)
 An essay on a vacation spent in Cold Harbor by Wall Street Journal columnist Terry Teachout
 Putnam History Museum
 "A Look At Cold Spring's History", CBS

Villages in New York (state)
Populated places established in 1846
New York (state) populated places on the Hudson River
Villages in Putnam County, New York
1846 establishments in New York (state)